The Pittsburgh–Syracuse football rivalry is an American college football rivalry between the Pittsburgh Panthers and Syracuse Orange. It began in 1916 and has been played every year since 1955. The Panthers and Orange were both Eastern football independents for most of their history but have shared the same football conference since 1991 when the Big East Football Conference was formed from Eastern football independents. Pitt is the most played opponent for Syracuse and Syracuse is the third most played opponent for Pitt. Sharing membership in the Atlantic Coast Conference (ACC) since 2013, the Panthers and Orange are designated cross-divisional opponents. Beginning in 2023, the ACC eliminated the Atlantic and Coastal divisions, going to one division. The Panthers and Orange were designated primary opponents, ensuring they will meet annually. They have played a total of 78 times, with Pittsburgh leading the series 43–31–3.

History

Series record
From 1916–56, Pittsburgh led 8–2–2, but Syracuse went 11–5 to tie the series up. Pittsburgh then went on an 11-year winning streak from 1973–83. However, Syracuse went 16–1–1 from 1984–2001 to take the series lead (29–25–3). Pittsburgh has gone 18–2 since to retake the lead.

Big East Conference (1991–2012)
Syracuse was a charter member of the Big East Conference, founded as a basketball prioritized conference in 1979 that did not sponsor football. Pitt joined Syracuse as a member of the Big East Conference in 1982. Both Pitt and Syracuse moved their football teams, both playing as Independents, into the Big East Football Conference in 1991 when they and other football-playing members of the Big East, along with additional Eastern independent teams, decided to form a football conference under the auspices of the existing Big East Conference.

Since 1991, Pittsburgh and Syracuse have played twenty-two times while in the Big East until trouble started to rumble through the conference starting in 2005 with the "football" and "non-football" schools of the conference, led to instability in the conference. Several schools left the conference for the Atlantic Coast Conference. The Big East became more unstable starting in 2011 when Pittsburgh and Syracuse submitted formal applications to join the ACC, which were accepted on September 18, 2011.

Atlantic Coast Conference (2013–present)
Pittsburgh and Syracuse officially joined the ACC on July 1, 2013.

Pittsburgh is placed in the Coastal division of the ACC and Syracuse is in the Atlantic division. The teams of the ACC have a permanent inter-divisional opponent, where a team from the Atlantic and Coastal divisions will play annually which was added for traditional rivalries like the North Carolina–NC State football rivalry to continue annually despite not being in the same division. When Pittsburgh and Syracuse joined the conference they were made each other's permanent inter-divisional opponent.

Game results

See also  
 List of NCAA college football rivalry games

Notes

References

College football rivalries in the United States
Pittsburgh Panthers football
Syracuse Orange football